Lost Creek is a tributary of Shenandoah Creek in Schuylkill County, Pennsylvania, in the United States. The creek is an ephemeral stream in its lower reaches and is impaired by abandoned mine drainage. It is in the Western Middle Anthracite Field. The creek has historically been used as a water supply. It is designated as a Coldwater Fishery.

Course
Lost Creek begins in the Number Three Reservoir in West Mahanoy Township. It flows southwest and enters the Raven Run Reservoir. From the southwestern end of that reservoir, the creek turns south and flows through a deep, narrow valley for several tenths of a mile, passing through the Number One Reservoir. It then reaches the end of its valley and turns south-southeast for a few tenths of a mile, passing between two ponds before reaching its confluence with Shenandoah Creek.

Hydrology
Lost Creek is designated as an impaired waterbody. The cause of the impairment is metals other than mercury and the likely source is abandoned mine drainage. The creek is an ephemeral stream in its lower reaches, on account of losing most or all of its flow to underground mine complexes. An abandoned mine drainage discharge known as the Weston Mine Lost Creek-Buck Mountain discharge is located within the creek's watershed.

Geography and geology

Lost Creek is in the Western Middle Anthracite Field. Dried sediment from the creek is grayish brown in the Munsell color system.

Watershed
The creek is entirely within the United States Geological Survey quadrangle of Shenandoah. Its mouth is located within  of the community of West William Penn.

The watershed of Lost Creek occupies approximately 0.8 percent of the Mahanoy Creek drainage basin. It is in the north-central part of the Shenandaoh Creek watershed and the upper part of the Mahanoy Creek watershed.

The designated use of Lost Creek is aquatic life.

History
Lost Creek was entered into the Geographic Names Information System on August 2, 1979. Its identifier in the Geographic Names Information System is 1179963.

In the late 1800s, 20,000 European larches were planted near the north bank of Lost Creek to help establish a second-growth forest. In the early 1900s, Lost Creek was a clear stream upstream of the Packer No. 2 Colliery, which was owned by the Lehigh Valley Coal Company. At the colliery, large amounts of mine water and culm polluted the creek. The creek was used as a water supply by the Girard Water Company during this time period.

Biology
Lost Creek is classified as a Coldwater Fishery.

In 2001, macroinvertebrates were observed in Lost Creek, but no fish were observed. Only four macroinvertebrate taxa were observed: Limnephilidae, Tipulidae, Cambaridae, and Oligochaeta. All were classified as "rare", with only one or two individuals being observed.

In 2001, the family-level Hilsenhoff Biotic Index value of Lost Creek was 6.

See also
Kehly Run, next tributary of Shendandoah Creek going upstream
List of rivers of Pennsylvania
List of tributaries of Mahanoy Creek

References

Rivers of Schuylkill County, Pennsylvania
Tributaries of Mahanoy Creek
Rivers of Pennsylvania